Park Sang-hyeok (born 20 April 1998) is a South Korean footballer currently playing as a midfielder for Suwon Bluewings.

Career statistics

Club

Notes

References

1998 births
Living people
South Korean footballers
Korea University alumni
Association football midfielders
K League 1 players
Suwon Samsung Bluewings players
Footballers from Seoul